Thomas Azevedo Guimarâes (born 31 August 1991) is a Belgian professional footballer with Portuguese roots, who currently plays as a winger for Bocholt in the Belgian Division 2.

Before joining OH Leuven, Azevedo played with Lommel United until 2011. After the 2010-11 season, he was signed by newly promoted team OH Leuven. Part of the transfer sum was paid by Anderlecht, who thereby have the first option to sign Azevedo. On the last day of the winter 2013–14 transfer window, Azevedo moved on loan to Go Ahead Eagles.

References

External links
 Voetbal International profile 

1991 births
Living people
Belgian people of Portuguese descent
Belgian footballers
Lommel S.K. players
Oud-Heverlee Leuven players
Go Ahead Eagles players
K. Patro Eisden Maasmechelen players
Belgian Pro League players
Challenger Pro League players
Eredivisie players
Belgian expatriate footballers
Expatriate footballers in the Netherlands

Association football forwards